The 1981 Murjani WTA Championships was a women's tennis tournament played on outdoor clay courts at the Amelia Island Plantation on Amelia Island, Florida in the United States that was part of the 1981 WTA Tour. It was the second edition of the tournament and was held from April 20 through April 26, 1981. First-seeded Chris Evert-Lloyd won the singles title and earned $32,000 first-prize money.

Finals

Singles

 Chris Evert-Lloyd defeated  Martina Navratilova 6–0, 6–0
 It was Evert-Lloyd's 4th singles title of the year and the 105th of her career.

Doubles

 Kathy Jordan /  Anne Smith defeated  Joanne Russell /  Virginia Ruzici 6–3, 5–7, 7–6(7–2)
 It was Jordan's 2nd doubles title of the year and the 10th of her career. It was Smith's 2nd doubles title of the year and the 16th of her career.

See also
 Evert–Navratilova rivalry

References

External links
 ITF tournament edition details
 WTA tournament draws

Amelia Island Championships
1981 WTA Tour
Murjani WTA Championships
Murjani WTA Championships
Murjani WTA Championships